The Billings Mustangs are an independent baseball team of the Pioneer League, which is not affiliated with Major League Baseball (MLB) but is an MLB Partner League. They are located in Billings, Montana, and have played their home games at Dehler Park since 2008. The team previously played at Cobb Field.

History

The Mustangs joined the Pioneer League in 1948 and, with the exception of a five-year gap between 1964 and 1968, have been members ever since. The league was affiliated with MLB teams until 2020, when it was reorganized as an independent league. Prior to this, the Mustangs had affiliations with the Brooklyn Dodgers (1949–1951), Pittsburgh Pirates (1952–1956), St. Louis Cardinals (1957–1963), Seattle Pilots (1969), Kansas City Royals (1970–1973), and Cincinnati Reds (1974–2020).

The Mustangs won three consecutive Pioneer League championships from 1992 to 1994, then won another in 1997. In 2003, Billings swept the Provo Angels in the championship series, winning two games to none. Billings, the last team to qualify for the postseason, won game one at Provo 8–5 in 11 innings, then, Billings won 3–0 on a no-hitter by James Paduch to win the championship in front of a sold-out Cobb Field in Billings. The game was a pitchers' duel between two of the top pitchers in the league (Provo's being 2003 Pioneer League Pitcher of the Year Abel Moreno). In 2006, Chris Valaika set a Pioneer League record with a 32-game hitting streak during the Mustangs 51-win campaign.

Many major league stars have begun their pro careers in Billings. These include George Brett, Reggie Sanders, Paul O'Neill, Trevor Hoffman, Keith Lockhart, Danny Tartabull, Ben Broussard, Scott Sullivan, Aaron Boone, Adam Dunn, Austin Kearns, and B. J. Ryan.

After years of award-winning work in the front office, Assistant General Manager Gary Roller was promoted to General Manager for the 2005 season. Roller took over for long time GM and Mustangs Hall-of-Famer Bob Wilson. Matt Bender, who formerly handled the duties of Official Scorer, took over the vacated Assistant General Manager position.

Dehler Park (and before at Cobb Field) is renowned in the Pioneer League for the "Beer Batter" tradition. Every game the Mustangs Beer Boosters designate one player as the "Beer Batter." If that player gets a hit, attendees can buy four beers for $10. Many eager buyers stand at the stairs anticipating a hit and the oncoming rush of people.

The Billings Mustangs changed their logo for the 2006 season. The 2007 season was their last at Cobb Field and the Mustangs begin the 2008 season at Dehler Park. On September 11, 2014, the Mustangs defeated the Orem Owlz for their first Pioneer League Championship since the 2003 season. After the 2014 season, the team introduced its new ownership group, Main Street Baseball at a December 5 in a press conference at Dehler Park.

In conjunction with a contraction of Minor League Baseball in 2021, the Pioneer League was converted to an independent baseball league and granted status as an MLB Partner League, with Billings continuing as members.

Playoffs

1978: Defeated Idaho Falls 2–0 to win league championship
1980: Lost to Lethbridge 2–1 in finals.
1983: Defeated Calgary 3–1 to win league championship.
1984: Lost to Helena 3–1 in finals.
1992: Defeated Salt Lake 2–0 to win league championship.
1993: Defeated Helena 3–2 to win league championship.
1994: Defeated Helena 2–1 to win league championship.
1997: Defeated Great Falls 2–0 to win league championship.
1999: Lost to Missoula 2–0 in finals.
2001: Defeated Provo 2–0 to win league championship.
2003: Defeated Provo 2–0 to win league championship.
2014: Defeated Great Falls 2–0 in semifinals; defeated Orem 2–0 to win league championship.
2015: Lost to Missoula 2–1 in semifinals.
2016: Defeated Great Falls 2–0 in semifinals; lost to Orem 2–0 in finals.
2018: Lost to Great Falls 2–1 in semifinals.

Roster

Hall of Fame alumni

 George Brett (1971) Inducted, 1999
 Trevor Hoffman (1989) Inducted, 2018

Notable alumni

1951 Larry Shepard (Player-Manager)
1955 Bennie Daniels, Dick Stuart
1957 Chris Cannizzaro
1958 Jim Hickman
1969 Gorman Thomas
1970 Al Cowens, Jim Wohlford
1971 Mark Littell
1972 Jamie Quirk
1973 Ruppert Jones, Bob McClure, Rodney Scott
1974 Ron Oester, Harry Spilman
1975 Larry Rothschild
1976 Eddie Milner
1977 Tom Foley
1978 Skeeter Barnes, Nick Esasky, Gary Redus
1980 Dave Miley, Danny Tartabull
1982 Tom Browning, Kal Daniels
1983 Gary Denbo, Rob Dibble, Lenny Harris, Joe Oliver, Kurt Stillwell
1986 Keith Lockhart
1987 Jack Armstrong, Butch Henry, Reggie Jefferson, Ed Taubensee
1988 Reggie Sanders, Jerry Spradlin
1989 Trevor Hoffman
1992 Chad Mottola, Eric Owens
1993 Paul Bako, Chris Sexton, Scott Sullivan
1994 Aaron Boone
1995 Ray King, Jason LaRue, John Riedling
1996 Lance Davis
1997 Gookie Dawkins, Donnie Scott (Manager), Scott Williamson, DeWayne Wise
1998 Adam Dunn, Austin Kearns, B. J. Ryan
1999 Ben Broussard, Scott Dunn, John Koronka, Brad Salmon
2000 Russ Nixon (Manager), Randy Ruiz
2001 Todd Coffey, Edwin Encarnación, Ted Power (Pitching Coach)
2002 William Bergolla
2003 Rick Burleson (Manager), Chris Dickerson, Miguel Perez, Joey Votto
2004 Paul Janish, Chris Sabo (Hitting Coach), Craig Tatum
2005 Jay Bruce, Carlos Fisher, Sam LeCure, Adam Rosales, Jeff Stevens, Travis Wood
2006 Danny Dorn, Juan Francisco, Chris Heisey, Marcos Mateo, Logan Ondrusek, Denis Phipps, Josh Roenicke, Jordan Smith, Drew Stubbs, Justin Turner, Chris Valaika
2007 Scott Carroll, Enerio Del Rosario, Todd Frazier, Jeremy Horst, Curtis Partch
2008 Justin Freeman, Josh Ravin, Miguel Rojas, Dave Sappelt, Neftali Soto 
2009 Daniel Corcino, Didi Gregorius, Donnie Joseph
2010 Tucker Barnhart, Billy Hamilton, Yorman Rodriguez
2011 Tony Cingrani, Carlos Contreras, Steve Selsky, Kyle Waldrop
2012 Amir Garrett, Jon Moscot, Sal Romano, Robert Stephenson, Jesse Winker
2013 Layne Somsen, Zack Weiss, Daniel Wright
2019 Noah Davis

References

External links
 
 Statistics from Baseball-Reference

Baseball teams established in 1948
1948 establishments in Montana
Pioneer League (baseball) teams
Sports in Billings, Montana
Professional baseball teams in Montana
Cincinnati Reds minor league affiliates
Brooklyn Dodgers minor league affiliates
Kansas City Royals minor league affiliates
St. Louis Cardinals minor league affiliates
Pittsburgh Pirates minor league affiliates
Seattle Pilots minor league affiliates